Robert Ambrose may refer to:

Robert Ambrose (composer) (1824–1908), Canadian organist and composer
Robert Ambrose (politician) (1855–1940), Irish politician